The Gentle Killers is a 1957 television serial. The six-part half-hour series was produced by ATV and aired on ITV. Cast included Tony Church and Hazel Court. It was written by Lewis Greifer and Leigh Vance. There is very scarce information on this series online, even though (unlike many British series of the era) the episodes still exist in the archives.

References

See also
The Man Who Finally Died
Five Names for Johnny
The Voodoo Factor
Motive for Murder

1957 British television series debuts
1957 British television series endings
1950s British drama television series
1950s British television miniseries
Black-and-white British television shows
English-language television shows
ITV television dramas
Television series by ITV Studios
Television shows produced by Associated Television (ATV)